The Mystery of Holly Lane is a 1953 mystery novel by English author Enid Blyton and the eleventh book in Enid Blyton's Mystery Series featuring the Five Find-Outers.

Plot summary
The Five Find Outers - Fatty, Larry, Daisy, Pip and Bets - are together again in the school holidays. Bored without a mystery, they decide to practise disguising themselves and shadowing people. Larry dresses up as a window cleaner, and unexpectedly the five children come across a robbery at a house in Holly Lane, the windows of which Larry has cleaned. The house belongs to a blind old man, who has apparently hidden his savings somewhere in the furniture. When the man reports the money stolen, the Find Outers initially believe it to be a simple robbery, but then in the middle of the night, all the old man's furniture is mysteriously spirited away as well.

The suspects include Wilfrid, the old man's grandson, and his cousin Marian. When Marian herself disappears, suspicion falls firmly on her and bumbling village policeman Mr Goon is convinced she is the thief - but Fatty thinks differently. Will Fatty solve this mystery?

Characters
The Five Find-Outers and Dog:

Fatty (Frederick Algernon Trotteville)
Larry (Lawrence Daykin)
Daisy (Margaret Daykin)
Pip (Philip Hilton)
Bets (Elizabeth Hilton)
Buster - Scottie (Fatty's dog)

Other characters:

Marian - the blind old man's granddaughter
Mr Goon - the village policeman
Mr Henri - a Frenchman who is staying next door to the house in Holly Lane
Victim - blind old man
Wilfred - nephew of the victim
Superintendent Jenks - A friend of the Five Find-Outers

Chapters

The book contains 22 Chapters.

 OFF TO MEET FATTY
 A LITTLE BIT OF HELP
 IT'S NICE TO BE TOGETHER AGAIN
 A FEW LITTLE PLANS
 FATTY ENJOYS HIMSELF
 A FEW REPORTS
 WHERE IS BUSTER?
 MR GOON GETS A SHOCK
 THE OLD MAN IN THE BUNGALOW
 GOON TAKES CHARGE
 TEA AT PIP'S
 STRANGE HAPPENINGS
 SUSPECTS-AND CLUES
 FATTY TELLS QUITE A STORY
 FATTY GETS GOING
 MOSTLY ABOUT WINDOW-CLEANERS
 A TALK IN THE ICE-CREAM SHOP
 A CHAT WITH WILFRID-AND A SURPRISE
 AN EXTRAORDINARY FIND
 NIGHT ADVENTURE
 MARIAN
 QUITE A PANTOMIME

External links
The Mystery of Holly Lane at the Enid Blyton Society website

Novels by Enid Blyton
1953 British novels
Methuen Publishing books
1953 children's books